The Euroferry Olympia is a  operated by the Italian Grimaldi Lines, in service since 1995. The ship operated as Transeuropa in the Baltic Sea by the Finnish shipping company Finnlines until November 2013. The new owner Grimaldi operated the ship in the Mediterranean. On February 18, 2022, a major fire broke out on the ship when it was north of Corfu.

Description
As built, there was capacity for 90 passengers.

History

It was built as yard number B501/03 by Stocznia Gdańska S.A., Gdańsk, Poland. It was launched as Transeuropa on December 29, 1994 and delivered to Poseidon Schiffahrt OHG, Lübeck, Germany on May 31, 1995. The IMO Number 9010175 was allocated. It entered service on the Lübeck–Helsinki route on 6 December. In 2000, Transeuropa was registered to Finnlines Deutschland, Lübeck, entering service on the Helsinki–Travemünde route on January 10, 2001.

On November 6, 2007, Transeuropa was placed on the Lübeck–Saint Petersburg route. This was changed to Lübeck–Mukran–Saint Petersburg on February 13, 2009 then Lübeck–Mukran–Helskinki–Saint Petersburg–Kotka–Lübeck on May 30. The ship was placed on the Lübeck–Rostock–Kotka–Helsinki route on December 30, 2009 then Lübeck–Ventspils–Saint Petersburg from January 2010 to October 6, 2012. Transeuropa sailed on the Helsinki–Rostock route from November 13 until October 2013.

In November 2013, Transeuropa was sold to Atlantica Navigazione, Naples, Italy. The ship sailed from Travemünde for Malta on November 2, arriving on November 20. Renamed Euroferry Olympia, it entered service on the Ravenna–Igoumenitsa–Patras route in January 2014.

2022 fire 
On February 18, 2022, at around 4:30 a.m. local time (UTC+2), a fire broke out on the ship in international waters near Diapontia Islands, northwest of Corfu while en route from Igoumenitsa in north-west Greece to Brindisi in south-east Italy. The captain instigated an effective evacuation of the ship.
According to authorities, there were at least 292 people on board: 239 registered passengers and two refugees who were not officially checked in, as well as 51 crew members. Grimaldi confirmed that there were 153 vehicles on board. The fire broke out in the parking deck, probably in a truck. Euroferry Olympia was brought closer to the north Corfu coast to offer better protection from the wind.

The ship was later towed to Astakos to complete the fire-fighting and by 23 March the bodies of the eleven missing passengers had been recovered.

The Greek union of lorry drivers (SEOFAE) accused Grimaldi of overloading the ship; the company denied this, stating that passenger numbers were at only 42 per cent of capacity, all 159 lorry drivers had cabins, and overbooking of freight vehicles was prevented. Grimaldi said that it complied with international rules forbidding passengers entering the garage decks while the ship is moving, though an Italian truck driver told RAI that he and many other truck drivers had previously camped in the car deck on the Euroferry Olympia.

The Greek and Italian agencies - Hellenic Bureau for Marine Casualties Investigation (HBMCI) and Direzione Generale Investigation Ferroviarie e Maritime (DIGIFEMA) - commenced a joint accident investigation. At the same time the captain and the two 1st mates were briefly detained to allow statements to be taken.

References

1994 ships
Ships built in Gdańsk
Ferries of Germany
Ferries of Italy
Maritime incidents in 2022
Maritime incidents in Greece
2022 disasters in Greece
Ship fires